Ready for the World is an American R&B band from Flint, Michigan, that scored several pop, soul and dance hits in the mid to late 1980s. They were founded by Melvin Riley and Gordon Strozier.

Discography

Studio albums

Compilation albums
Oh Sheila! Ready for the World's Greatest Hits (1993, MCA Records)
20th Century Masters - The Millennium Collection: The Best of Ready for the World (2002, MCA Records)

Singles

See also
List of number-one hits (United States)
List of artists who reached number one on the Hot 100 (U.S.)
List of number-one dance hits (United States)
List of artists who reached number one on the U.S. Dance chart

References

External links
Ready for the World official website

African-American musical groups
American contemporary R&B musical groups
American dance music groups
Musical groups from Flint, Michigan